The North Grenville Curling Club Women's Fall Curling Classic (formerly the Royal LePage OVCA Women's Fall Classic and the Royal LePage Women's Fall Classic) is an annual women's bonspiel, or curling tournament, held in Kemptville, Ontario. It is held in early November and is put on by the North Grenville Curling Club. It was a World Curling Tour event from 2010 to 2019.

The event began in 2006 as the Scotiabank OVCA Women's Fall Classic. Royal LePage became a sponsor in 2007, and has been a sponsor ever since except for the 2009 event.

Past champions

References

External links
Official site

Leeds and Grenville United Counties
Ontario Curling Tour events
Women's curling competitions in Canada